Brenthia formosensis is a species of moth of the family Choreutidae. It was described by Syuti Issiki in 1931. It is found in Taiwan, Japan and on the Ryukyu Islands.

References

Brenthia
Moths described in 1930
Moths of Japan
Moths of Taiwan